The War of Southern Queensland was a conflict fought between a coalition of Aboriginal tribes in South East Queensland, the "United Tribes", and the United Kingdom of Great Britain and Ireland, from around 1843 to 1855. Following the Kilcoy massacre in 1842, a great meeting was held in the Bunya Scrub of tribes from across South East Queensland north to the Wide Bay-Burnett and Bundaberg regions, fuelled by decades of mistrust and misunderstanding with the British, they united into a loose confederation and issued a "declaration" to destroy the settlements on their lands.

Most of the Wide Bay-Burnett was abandoned during this period, and the settlements on the ranges were under heavy attack by the Mountain Tribes led by Multuggerah. The worst of the conflict was largely confined to these parts of the country, but the main settlement of Brisbane also suffered from raids that pillaged houses and farms. The war marked a reversal in traditional Indigenous battle tactics, moving away from pitched battles early in the conflict to more "hit and run" attacks and aspects of guerrilla warfare.

Following over a decade of sustained conflict along with suffering from severe population loss, resistance against the British largely collapsed in the south. Conflict continued well into the 1860s as the frontier moved further north. The general date for the end of the southern war is attributed to the hanging of Dundalli in 1855, and the subsequent arrival of the Native Police which caused the remaining Aboriginal raiders in Brisbane to flee the town.

Declaration of war
The Aboriginal tribes of South East Queensland every year would gather at the Great Bunya Scrub (Baroon Pocket near Maleny) to feast on Bunya nuts. The occasion was formally used as a festival, to exchange news amongst the tribes. However, following the Kilcoy massacre many of the tribes were aggravated, with many wanting vengeance for the great number that were killed at Kilcoy. At this meeting and spurred on by elders such as Dundalli, the tribes vowed to take revenge on the British wherever they were within their lands.
Two witnesses to this were Petrie and Russell who risked their lives to bring news of the "war declaration" to Brisbane, after having been captured by an inter-tribal group and only freed through severe negotiation. This was followed by a letter sent by German missionaries to the Governor of the war declaration.
Pugh's Almanac in 1869 noted 1843 as "when the blacks were now beginning to be very troublesome". And travel writer, Nehemiah Bartley gave defined years for the war in his book, Australian Pioneers and Reminiscences (1896). Citing 1843 and 1855 as the start and end dates, with the 1855 likely referencing the execution of Dundalli.

Decline of the Moreton Bay Clans
The missionaries Christopher Eipper and J.C.S. Handt both prepared annual reports on the state of the Moreton Bay Aborigines. Handt noted the considerable decline of Aboriginal numbers.

In 1846 the Anglican Rev. John Gregor of Brisbane claimed a deathrate of one-sixth of the local black population in a period of three years, from what he termed "licentious intercourse of their females with Europeans" - and further deaths locally of 50 Europeans and at least 300 hundred Aborigines during incessant "collisions of aggression, defence and retaliation" in the Moreton Bay District.

Notes

Australian frontier wars
Wars involving the United Kingdom
Conflicts in 1843
History of Brisbane